Electoral competition or electoral competitiveness describes the amount of competition in electoral politics between candidates or political parties, usually measured by the margin of victory.

United States 
In American federal elections, races for U.S. Senate tend to be more competitive than those for U.S. House of Representatives. Even in wave election years, the vast majority of U.S. House members keep their seats, with little pressure from the opposing party. Competition in U.S. House races has been in decline since at least the 1960s.

References 

Elections